The Weir formula is a formula used in indirect calorimetry, relating metabolic rate to oxygen consumption and carbon dioxide production. According to original source, it says:

Metabolic rate (kcal per day) = 1440 (3.9 VO2 + 1.1 VCO2)

where VO2 is oxygen consumption in litres per minute and VCO2 is the rate of carbon dioxide production in litres per minute. 
The formula can also be written for units of calories per day where VO2 is oxygen consumption expressed in millilitres per minute and VCO2 is the rate of carbon dioxide production in millilitres per minute.

Another source gives

Energy (kcal/min) = (respiration in L/min times change in percentage oxygen) / 20

This corresponds to:

Metabolic rate (cal per minute) = 5 (VO2 in mL/min)

References

Further reading

Calorimetry